Arlington is a neighborhood in southern Pittsburgh, Pennsylvania. The zip code used by residents is 15210, and the neighborhood has representation on Pittsburgh City Council by the council member for District 3 (Central South Neighborhoods). Arlington houses PBF 22 Engine, and is covered by PBP Zone 3 and the Bureau of EMS Medic 2. The City has discussed the possibility of closing 22 engine completely.  22 engine is a vital key to second and third alarm firefighting in the city.

Surrounding neighborhoods
Arlington has eight borders, six with the Pittsburgh neighborhoods of the South Side Slopes to the north, 
Arlington Heights to the northeast, South Side Flats to the far east, Hays to the southeast, St. Clair to the south, and Mt. Oliver to the southwest.  The other two borders are with the boroughs of Baldwin to the southeast and Mt. Oliver to the northwest

References

Further reading

See also
 List of Pittsburgh neighborhoods

External links
Interactive Pittsburgh Neighborhoods Map
Neighborhoods in Pittsburgh